The 2011 FIA WTCC Race of Germany was the eighth round of the 2011 World Touring Car Championship season and the seventh running of the FIA WTCC Race of Germany. It was held on 31 July 2011 at the Motorsport Arena Oschersleben in Oschersleben, Germany.

The first race was won by Yvan Muller of Chevrolet RML and the second race was won by Franz Engstler of Liqui Moly Team Engstler who took his and the team's first victory in the World Touring Car Championship.

Background
After the previous round, Robert Huff was leading the world drivers' championship. Norbert Michelisz was leading the Yokohama drivers' trophy by two points over Kristian Poulsen.

Ibrahim Okyay and Borusan Otomotiv Motorsport returned to the championship having last competed in the Race of Italy. Stefano D'Aste returned to Wiechers-Sport having been forced to miss the Race of UK due to commitments in the GT4 European Cup.

Poulsen would get a five–place grid penalty for race one after he was deemed responsible for the collision with Michelisz at Donington Park. Muller would be driving under a two race three–place suspended grid penalty after a controversial pass on Huff at the previous round.

Report

Free practice
Muller led the first practice session which took place in wet conditions. Alain Menu was second and Gabriele Tarquini was third, championship leader Huff was fourth. Aleksei Dudukalo ended his session on his first lap when the front splitter on his SUNRED León broke and he beached it in the gravel. Yukinori Taniguchi also went through the gravel but was able to return to the track after assistance from the marshals. He returned to the pits but was black flagged when he left the pits again after repairs. The session was stopped just over half way through when Fabio Fabiani spun and put his Proteam Racing BMW 320si into the tyre wall at the first corner.

Huff topped the second practice session with Muller second fastest and Robert Dahlgren in the Volvo C30 third.

Qualifying
Muller secured pole position for race one with Dahlgren joining him on the front row. Dahlgren was quickest in Q1, while Engstler set his best time late on to end up tenth and get through to the second session, also securing him the pole position for race two.

When the top ten shootout began, Dahlgren looked to be on pole for a while before Muller set his best time. Huff lined up on the second row alongside Tarquini while Tom Coronel shared the third row with Menu. Michelisz was the leading independent driver in seventh. Race two pole sitter would start ninth for race one.

Warm-Up
Huff led a Chevrolet 1–2 in the wet warm–up session on Sunday morning, pole sitter Muller was second while Polestar Racing's Dahlgren was third.

Race One
The weather hadn't improved much since the warm–up session and the first race took place in wet conditions. The race was started at the third attempt of the rolling start as the cars failed line up through the grid slots correctly. Muller led away from the start as Dahlgren dropped down to fifth before turn one, dropped down even further when he collided with Menu's Chevrolet. Huff was now in second and stayed close to Muller for the first few laps until he lost ground on lap four having run wide. Huff narrowly stayed ahead of Tarquini and began closing in on team–mate Muller but was unable to pass on the final lap. Dudukalo and Engstler meanwhile made contact, the BMW driver spinning and dropping down the order as a result. Muller won the race with Huff second and Tarquini a distant third. Dahlgren recovered to fourth with Menu fifth and Yokohama Trophy winner D'Aste sixth. Michel Nykjær, Pepe Oriola, Dudukalo and Coronel completed the top ten.

Race Two
Engstler started from pole position but lost his position at the start to Michelisz while Mehdi Bennani and Poulsen collided further back, their cars crashing into the pit wall. The safety car was brought out while the debris was cleared from the track, Michelisz kept his lead the restart. He spun out of the lead on lap four and dropped to fourth, handing the lead of the race back to Engstler. Muller was making his way up from ninth on the grid and was running fourth at one point. Coronel and Michelisz clashed with the Zengő-Dension Team driver ending his race in the tyre wall at the first corner. Muller then got sideways and this allowed Coronel to re–pass the Chevrolet. Engstler took the win and ended eleven consecutive wins for Chevrolet with Menu second having been close behind since the restart. Tarquini was third, Coronel fourth and Muller fifth. Huff saw his championship reduced further by finishing behind Muller in sixth.

Results

Qualifying

Bold denotes Pole position for second race.

Race 1

Bold denotes Fastest lap.

Race 2

Bold denotes Fastest lap.

Standings after the event

Drivers' Championship standings

Yokohama Independents' Trophy standings

Manufacturers' Championship standings

 Note: Only the top five positions are included for both sets of drivers' standings.

References

External links
World Touring Car Championship official website

Germany
FIA WTCC Race of Germany